Jean-Baudouin Mayo Mambeke is a Congolese politician and Union for the Congolese Nation Member of the National Assembly of the Democratic Republic of the Congo.

References

Year of birth missing (living people)
Living people
Members of the National Assembly (Democratic Republic of the Congo)
Union for the Congolese Nation politicians
21st-century Democratic Republic of the Congo people